Edward St. Maur, 11th Duke of Somerset  (24 February 1775 – 15 August 1855), styled Lord Seymour until 1793, of Maiden Bradley in Wiltshire and Stover House, Teigngrace, Devon, was a British peer, landowner, astrologer and mathematician.

Biography
Seymour was born at Monkton Farleigh in Wiltshire, the son and heir of Webb Seymour, 10th Duke of Somerset (1718–1793), by his wife Mary Bonnell, daughter of John Bonnell, of Stanton Harcourt, Oxfordshire. He was baptised on 4 April 1775 at Monkton Farleigh, with the name of Edward Seymour, but later changed it to Edward St. Maur, in the belief it was the original ancient form of the name.

In 1793 he succeeded his father in the dukedom. In 1795, in the company of Reverend John Henry Michell, he undertook a tour through England, Wales and Scotland, which he recorded in a journal, published in 1845. The tour took him as far as the Isles of Staffa and Iona in the Hebrides. He was a gifted mathematician and served as president of the Linnean Society of London from 1834 to 1837 and as president of the Royal Institution from 1826 to 1842. He was also a Fellow of the Royal Society. In 1837 he was made a Knight of the Garter by Queen Victoria. Seymour was also set to serve as the first President of the Astronomical Society of London (later the Royal Astronomical Society), having been unanimously elected to this post at the Society's second public meeting on 29 February 1820. However, he was persuaded to resign the position within days of his election by his friend (and then President of the Royal Society) Joseph Banks, who strongly opposed the establishment of a specialist society for astronomy. He was a patron of the Free Church of England.

In 1808 he purchased a London townhouse on Park Lane which he named Somerset House, and where he spent much of his time. In addition, in 1829 he purchased from George Templer (1781–1843) the Devonshire estate of Stover in the parish of Teigngrace, near Newton Abbot, and made Stover House his principal residence, where he displayed the valuable "Hamilton" art collection brought as her marriage portion by his wife Lady Charlotte Hamilton, a daughter of the 9th Duke of Hamilton. This included paintings by Rubens, Lawrence and Reynolds. The principal seat of the Seymour family had been Maiden Bradley in Wiltshire, but for one more generation it remained Stover. The Stover purchase included the Stover Canal and the Haytor quarries and Haytor Granite Tramway. He added a large porte cochere with Doric columns to Stover House and built a matching entrance lodge.

Somerset married twice, firstly on 24 June 1800 to Lady Charlotte Douglas-Hamilton (6 April 1772 – Somerset House, Park Lane, London, 10 June 1827), daughter of Archibald Hamilton, 9th Duke of Hamilton, by whom he had seven children:
Edward Seymour, 12th Duke of Somerset (20 December 1804 – 28 December 1885), eldest son and heir, of Stover House. He married beneath his social station, in his relatives' opinion, whose two sons pre-deceased him. Upon his death, despite leaving three married daughters, the dukedom passed by law to his heir male, his younger brother, with whom he had developed an enmity after the latter called his wife Georgiana Sheridan a "low-bred greedy beggar woman, whose sole object was to get her hands on the property and leave it away from the direct heirs". The 12th Duke bequeathed Stover and its priceless contents, including the Hamilton treasures, in trust for his illegitimate grandson Harold St. Maur, which caused uproar on the part of his younger brother the 13th Duke, who considered the treasures to be family heirlooms which should have passed to him. He inherited Maiden Bradley House, presumably under an entail, but almost entirely stripped of its contents.
Archibald Seymour, 13th Duke of Somerset (30 December 1810 – 12 January 1891), second son, who succeeded his childless brother in the dukedom.
Algernon St. Maur, 14th Duke of Somerset (22 December 1813 – 2 October 1894)
Lady Charlotte Jane Seymour (1803 – 7 October 1889), who on 31 March 1839 married William Blount (d. 27 July 1885), of Orelton, Herefordshire 
Lady Jane Wilhelmina Seymour
Lady Anna Maria Jane Seymour (d. 23 September 1873), who on 13 September 1838 married William Tollemache (7 November 1810 – 17 March 1886), son of Hon. Charles Manners Tollemache of the Earls of Dysart by his wife Gertrude Florinda Gardiner.
Lady Henrietta Seymour

Following his first wife's death in 1827 he remarried on 28 July 1836 at Marylebone, Portland Place, London, to Margaret Shaw-Stewart, daughter of Sir Michael Shaw-Stewart, 5th Baronet of Blackhall, Renfrewshire, by his wife Catherine Maxwell, daughter of Sir William Maxwell, 3rd Baronet. The marriage was childless.

Somerset died at Somerset House in London, in August 1855, aged 80, and was buried at Kensal Green Cemetery, London. Margaret, his second wife, died at Somerset House on 18 July 1880, and was buried with her husband.

Ancestry

References

|-

1775 births
1855 deaths
Burials at Kensal Green Cemetery
511
Garter Knights appointed by William IV
Fellows of the Royal Society
Edward Seymour, 11th Duke of Somerset
Presidents of the Linnean Society of London
British landowners